Zohurul Hoque  (11 October 1926 – 18 January 2017) was an Indian Islamic scholar and doctor known for his translations of the Qur'an into the Bengali, Assamese and English languages. He later moved to Muscat in Oman.

Career

He published a Bengali translation of the Qur'an in 1986, after working on it for 12 years. He had started to work on an Assamese translation before the Bengali translation was complete. Hoque published the Assamese translation of The Quran in three volumes. He started work on an English translation in 1993. He published a book with more than 1250 pages titled Translation and Commentary on The Holy Quran on April 1, 2000. It was part of the Holy Quran Pub Project. The Assamese translation, published by Bina Library, Guwahati, Assam, is now in its sixth reprint. A new edition of his Bangla translation of the Quran has been published in June 2014.

Death
He died in Muscat, Oman on 18 January 2017, and was buried at the Central Public Graveyard in Al Amarat.

References

External links
A short biography
 Al-Quran project includes Zohurul Hoque's Bengali Quran translation.
Bengali translation of Quran by Dr. Zohurul Hoque (online)
Bengali and Assamese translations of Quran by Dr. Zohurul Hoque (pdf)

1926 births
2017 deaths
Indian Sunni Muslim scholars of Islam
University of Calcutta alumni
20th-century Indian translators
Translators of the Quran into English
Quran translators
Translators to Assamese
Translators of the Quran into Bengali
University of Michigan School of Public Health alumni
Bengali Muslim scholars of Islam
21st-century Bengalis
People from Karimganj district
20th-century Bengalis
Deaths in Oman
Omani people of Bengali descent